Yūdai, Yudai or Yuudai is a masculine Japanese given name.

Possible writings
Yūdai can be written using different combinations of kanji characters. Here are some examples:

勇大, "courage, big"
悠大, "calm, big"
雄大, "male, big"
優大, "gentleness, big"
祐大, "help, big"
佑大, "help, big"
裕大, "abundant, big"
有大, "have, big"
友大, "friend, big"

The name can also be written in hiragana ゆうだい or katakana ユウダイ.

Notable people with the name

, Japanese basketball player
, Japanese actor
, Japanese baseball player
, Japanese footballer
, Japanese footballer
, Japanese footballer
, Japanese footballer
, Japanese footballer
, Japanese cyclist
, Japanese baseball player
Yudai Tanaka (disambiguation), multiple people
, Japanese film director
, Japanese football referee

Japanese masculine given names